Solariella micraulax, common name the fine-groove solarelle, is a species of sea snail, a marine gastropod mollusk in the family Solariellidae.

Description
The size of the shell attains 8 mm.

Distribution
This marine species occurs in the Pacific Ocean off Alaska.

References

External links
 To Encyclopedia of Life
 To USNM Invertebrate Zoology Mollusca Collection
 To ITIS
 To World Register of Marine Species
 

micraulax
Gastropods described in 1964